Homage to Chagall: The Colours of Love is a 1977 Canadian documentary film about artist Marc Chagall directed by Harry Rasky.

Synopsis
Imaginatively utilizing more than 300 mosaics, stained-glass windows, murals and paintings, plus an in-depth interview with the famous Russian artist himself, Homage to Chagall is both a tribute to and a celebration of a life of intense productivity that encompassed everything from primitive mysticism to cubist intellectuality.

Reception
Writing in the Saturday Review, Judith Crist stated in that Homage to Chagall, "the filmmaker has made magical blend of sight and sound that transcends the screen in a triumphant tribute to humanism." Crist continues that Homage to Chagall "can be seen again and again, as it should. So masterly a homage to a master is a rare and wonderful achievement."

Homage to Chagall: The Colours of Love was nominated for an Academy Award for Best Documentary Feature. The Directors Guild of America awarded Rasky with Outstanding Direction of a Documentary/Actuality in 1985.

References

External links

1977 films
1977 documentary films
Canadian documentary films
Films directed by Harry Rasky
Documentary films about painters
Marc Chagall
1970s English-language films
1970s Canadian films